The Battle of Valmaseda (or Balmaseda) took place on 5 November 1808, during Lieutenant-General Blake's retreat from superior French armies in northern Spain. Reinforced by veteran regular infantry from General La Romana's Division of the North, Blake's force suddenly turned on its pursuers and ambushed General Victor's errant vanguard under Général de division Villatte.

Background
Napoleon's invasion of Spain had started  with the Battle of Zornoza, where Marshal François Lefebvre's failed to destroy the Spanish army, as Blake had shaken off the premature French assault and escaped with his army intact. Further mistakes were made in the French pursuit, namely when Victor carelessly allowed his Army Corps to spread out in its search for an enemy he regarded as beaten.

Forces

Major-General Eugene-Casimir Villatte commanded the 3rd Division of Lefebvre's IV Corps. This oversized unit included three battalions each of the 27th Light, 63rd, 94th and 95th Line Infantry Regiments, plus two foot artillery batteries.

Blake's Army of Galicia contained five infantry divisions, a vanguard and a reserve.

General Figueroa commanded the 1st Division [Hibernia, Santiago, Mallorca, Mandoñedo, Rey].

Gen Martinengo the 2nd Division [Segovia, Victoria, Voluntarios de Navarra, Pontevedra] (5,100)(7 Battalions).

Gen Riquelme the 3rd Division [Compostela, Gerona, Sevilla, 6th Marina](7 Battalions).

Gen Carbajal the 4th Division [Granaderos](10 Battalions, 1 present).

Gen La Romana the 5th Division [Barcelona, 1st Cataluña, 1st & 2nd Zamora, Princesa] (5,300)(7 Battalions).

Gen Mendizabal the vanguard [Aragon, 2nd Cataluña, Leon, Navos] (5 Battalions)

Gen Mahy the reserve [Granaderos, Battalion de General, Corona, Galica, Guardas Nacionales de Galica] (5 Battalions).

Asturian Division [Conges de Tineo, Salas, Siero, Villivicioa, Lena, Oviedo, Castropol] (10 Battalions).

There were 1,000 gunners manning 38 cannon and only 300 cavalry.

Battle

Victor tried to trap Gen Acevedo's Asturian Division, which had separated from Blake's army. Instead, Blake was able to draw the French into a trap of his own, and on 5 November Villatte's division, operating ahead of the other French formations, blundered into a brusque attack. This attack drove the French out of Valmaseda.

But while their leaders had erred badly, the iron discipline of the French soldiers did not fail them. Villatte, refusing to surrender, formed his troops into squares and managed to claw his way out of the Spanish encirclement. Even so, the Spaniards captured 300 men and one gun.

During the French retreat, Acevedo's errant division bumped into Villatte's baggage train and captured most of it. On 8 November a resurgent Victor recaptured Valmaseda, killing and wounding 150 and capturing 600 men from Blake's rearguard.

Upon learning of the battle, Napoleon, shocked that his Grande Armée should suffer even a minor defeat by "an army of bandits led by monks," severely reprimanded Victor for his imprudence. Victor redeemed himself two weeks later when he finally defeated Blake at the Battle of Espinosa.

Aftermath
Napoleon's invasion of Spain proceeded with the Siege of Roses.

References
 Smith, Digby. The Napoleonic Wars Data Book. London: Greenhill, 1998.

Footnotes

External links
 

Battles of the Peninsular War
Battles of the Napoleonic Wars
Battles involving Spain
Battles involving France
Battles in the Basque Country (autonomous community)
Basque history
Battle of Valmaseda
Battle of Valmaseda
November 1808 events